Little Bollington is a civil parish in Cheshire East, England. It contains four buildings that are recorded in the National Heritage List for England as designated listed buildings, all of which are at Grade II. This grade is the lowest of the three gradings given to listed buildings and is applied to "buildings of national importance and special interest". Apart from the village of Little Bollington the parish is rural, and all the listed buildings are houses.

See also

Listed buildings in Agden
Listed buildings in Altrincham
Listed buildings in Dunham Massey
Listed buildings in Millington
Listed buildings in Rostherne

References
Citations

Sources

 

Listed buildings in the Borough of Cheshire East
Lists of listed buildings in Cheshire